Angerstein is a surname. Notable people with the surname include:

People
 Anders Angerstein (1614–1659), German-Swedish ironmaster
 Fritz Angerstein (1891–1925), German mass murderer
 John Angerstein (MP) (–1858), English politician and Member of Parliament, son of John Julius
 John Julius Angerstein (1732–1823), London merchant and patron of the fine arts
 Karl Angerstein (1890–1985), senior Luftwaffe officer of World War II
 Reinhold Angerstein (1718–1760), Swedish metallurgist
 William Angerstein (1811–1897), British Liberal Party Member of Parliament

Families
 Angerstein family

See also
Angerstein Wharf, London